The Equalizer 3 is an upcoming American vigilante action film directed by Antoine Fuqua. It is the sequel to the 2018 film The Equalizer 2, which was based on the TV series of the same name. The film stars Denzel Washington and Dakota Fanning, reuniting on-screen for the first time since 2004's Man on Fire. It follows retired U.S. Marine and former CIA officer Robert McCall. The film is the fifth collaboration between Washington and Fuqua, following Training Day (2001), The Equalizer (2014), The Magnificent Seven (2016), and The Equalizer 2 (2018).

The film is set to be released on September 1, 2023, by Sony Pictures Releasing.

Cast
 Denzel Washington as Robert McCall
 Dakota Fanning
 Sonia Ben Ammar
 Remo Girone
 Andrea Dodero
 Eugenio Mastrandrea
 Andrea Scarduzio
 Salvatore Ruocco
 Daniele Perrone
 Gaia Scodellaro

Production

Development
In August 2018, Antoine Fuqua announced his plans to continue the film series. The filmmaker expressed interest in the plot taking place in an international setting.

By January 2022, a third film was officially confirmed to be in development, with Denzel Washington returning in the titular role. In June 2022, Dakota Fanning was announced to have been cast as well. By November 2022, Sonia Ben Ammar, Andrea Dodero, Remo Girone, Eugenio Mastrandrea, Daniele Perrone, Andrea Scarduzio, and Gaia Scodellaro were added to the cast.

Filming
Principal photography began on October 10, 2022 on the Amalfi Coast in Italy. Filming continued in the region until November 20, after which it moved to Naples in early December, before wrapping production by January 2023, in Rome. Fuqua once again served as director, with Washington announcing that it would be his next movie. Robert Richardson serves as director of photography on the project, after previously working with Fuqua on Emancipation.

Release 
The Equalizer 3 is set to be released on September 1, 2023, by Sony Pictures Releasing.

References

External links 
 

2023 action thriller films
2020s American films
2020s crime thriller films
2020s English-language films
2020s vigilante films
American action thriller films
American crime thriller films
American films about revenge
American sequel films
American vigilante films
Columbia Pictures films
Escape Artists films 
Films about the Central Intelligence Agency
Films based on television series
Films directed by Antoine Fuqua
Films produced by Antoine Fuqua
Films produced by Denzel Washington
Films shot in Naples
Films shot in Rome
Films with screenplays by Richard Wenk
The Equalizer
Upcoming English-language films
Upcoming sequel films